The 2006 Slovak Cup Final was the final match of the 2005–06 Slovak Cup, the 37th season of the top cup competition in Slovak football. The match was played at the Pasienky in Bratislava on 8 May 2006 between FC Spartak Trnava and MFK Ružomberok. Ružomberok defeated Spartak Trnava on penalties 4-3, after match ended 0:0.

Route to the final

Match

Details

References

Slovak Cup Finals
Slovak Cup
Slovak Cup
Cup Final
Slovak Cup Final 2006